Bipunctiphorus is a genus of moths in the family Pterophoridae described by Christian Gibeaux in 1994.

Species
Bipunctiphorus dimorpha (T. B. Fletcher, 1910) (=Bipunctiphorus etiennei Gibeaux, 1994)
Bipunctiphorus dissipata (Yano, 1963)
Bipunctiphorus euctimena (Turner, 1913)
Bipunctiphorus nigroapicalis B. Landry & Gielis, 1992
Bipunctiphorus pelzi Gielis, 2003

Platyptiliini
Moth genera